The Asian Football Confederation's 1986 AFC Women's Championship was held in December 1986 in Hong Kong. The tournament was won for the first time by China in the final against Japan.

Group stage

Group A

Group B

Knock-out stage

Semi-final

Third place match

Final

Winner

External links
 RSSSF.com

Women's Championship
AFC Women's Asian Cup tournaments
International association football competitions hosted by Hong Kong
Afc
AFC
AFC Women's Championship
AFC Championship